Ectoedemia quadrinotata is a moth of the family Nepticulidae. The known range of this species includes Ohio and Kentucky in the United States, and Manitoba, Ontario, and Quebec in Canada. This species was first described by American entomologist Annette Frances Braun in 1917.

The larvae mine the leaves of Carpinus caroliniana and Corylus americana. There are two generations per year (bivoltine), with mines initiated in July and again starting in late August.

The wingspan is 4–5 mm.

References

Nepticulidae
Moths of North America
Taxa named by Annette Frances Braun
Leaf miners
Moths described in 1917